Northstar California (previously Northstar-at-Tahoe) is a mountain resort in the western United States, located in Placer County, California, near the northwest shore of Lake Tahoe.

Approximately  from the San Francisco Bay Area, the  resort features  vertical drop of alpine terrain accessed by 19 lifts, a snowmaking system, a cross-country center, a village, on-site lodging and summer activities including an 18-hole golf course and a lift-served mountain bike park.

History
Northstar was a former lumber site once owned by the Douglas Lumber Company of Truckee and was acquired by Fibreboard when they purchased Douglas in 1967. Its original name was Timber Farm, but was changed to Northstar-at-Tahoe when the mountain opened  in December 1972. The first ski resort amenities included 5 chairlifts. The trails were designed by Luggi Foeger, an Austrian, who had fled Europe during World War II.

In 2007, CNL Lifestyle Properties acquired Northstar, which since 2010 has been operated under a triple-net lease by Vail Resorts. Vail also owns Heavenly Ski Resort and Kirkwood Mountain Resort both at Lake Tahoe, four other ski resorts in Colorado, including Vail, Breckenridge, Keystone, and Beaver Creek, and other ski resorts. Previously, Northstar had been owned by Booth Creek, a holdings company managed by George Nield Gillett Jr., the owner of the now defunct Gillett Holdings, a former owner of Vail Associates.

In 2016 EPR Properties agreed to purchase Northstar California in a package deal along with multiple other properties from CNL Lifestyle Properties for approximately $456 Million.

Terrain
Northstar features 3,170 acres of terrain, with 60% of trails designated for intermediate skiers. Grooming on trails is well-established and offers many "groomers" for resort visitors. In 2015, Ski Magazine listed the resort as the 24th best ski area in the western United States. The resort has been consistently rated as having one of the top 10 terrain parks in North America. It features seven different terrain parks for all different skills levels across 55 acres of terrain.

Snowfall
According to resort sources, the annual snowfall at Northstar is 350 inches per year. Snow totals are measured at the mountain summit and are counted from the first snowfall until closing day.

Village 

Northstar Village is based on a small village layout that centers a square which, in winter, has an ice skating rink.

Dining options include:

-Michael Mina's Bourbon Pub

-Rubicon Pizza Company

-Copper Lane Cafe & Provisions

-Los Arcos Mexican Grill

-Petra Wine Bar

-TC's Tap House

-The Grille at Sawtooth Ridge

-Starbucks Coffee

-White Rabbit Eatery

Gallery

References

External links

3dSkiMap of Northstar
Ski conditions at Northstar from Snowago
Resort Guide by Snow Forecast

Buildings and structures in Placer County, California
Ski areas and resorts in California
Tourist attractions in Placer County, California
Vail Resorts
1972 establishments in California